Highway 136 (AR 136, Ark. 136, Hwy. 136) is an east–west state highway in northeast Arkansas. The route of  runs from Highway 135 near Rivervale east across Highway 140 to Highway 77 near Etowah.

Route description
Highway 136 begins at Highway 135 east of Rivervale. The route runs east to concur northeasterly with Highway 140. The route continues alone to Etowah, where it passes the Garden Point Cemetery and Edward Samuel Wildy Barn, both listed on the National Register of Historic Places. The highway turns east to terminate at Highway 77 at Carroll's Corner.

Major intersections
Mile markers reset at concurrencies.

See also

 List of state highways in Arkansas

References

External links

136
Transportation in Mississippi County, Arkansas
Transportation in Poinsett County, Arkansas